The Solar Decathlon Europe (SDE) is an international student-based Competition that challenges collegiate Teams to design, build and operate highly efficient and innovative buildings powered by renewable energy. The winner of the Competition is the Team able to score the most points in 10 contests.

On Oct. 18, 2007, the Spanish and U.S. governments signed a memorandum of understanding in which the Spanish Ministry of Housing committed to organise and host a Solar Decathlon in Europe. The agreement was signed in Washington, D.C., next to the Universidad Politécnica de Madrid's Casa Solar during the U.S. Department of Energy Solar Decathlon 2007 Competition. The American signatory was Alexander A. Karsner, assistant secretary of the Office of Energy Efficiency and Renewable Energy Department of the U.S. Department of Energy, with Fernando Magro Fernández, undersecretary of housing of the Ministry of Housing representing the Spanish government.

Solar Decathlon Europe 2010 
Modeled after the U.S. Department of Energy Solar Decathlon, the first Solar Decathlon Europe took place in Madrid, Spain, in June 2010. Decathletes from 17 Teams spent 10 days competing in the Villa Solar near the Royal Palace of Madrid (Palacio Real). A combination of task completion, measurement, and jury scoring determined Solar Decathlon Europe's first champion: Virginia Polytechnic Institute and State University with Lumenhaus project.

Final results:

Solar Decathlon Europe 2012 

Second edition of the Solar Decathlon Europe was held from Sept. 14–30, 2012, in Madrid, Spain in the Casa de Campo. The final standings of its 18 competitors were::

Solar Decathlon Europe 2014 

Solar Decathlon Europe 2014 took place in Versailles, France, June 28–July 14, 2014.

Official final results:

And substitute Teams:

 : University of Zagreb / Team 
 : Politecnico di Torino / Team Sunslice
  : VIA University College / Universitat Jaume I / équipe 
 : Politehnica University of Timișoara / West University of Timișoara /

Solar Decathlon Europe after 2014 and the Energy Enedeavour Foundation 
After the Solar Decathlon Europe in 2014, previous organisers, participants, supporters and decathletes worked to create a vehicle for the longevity of the Solar Decathlon in Europe. The culmination of this work was the creation of the Energy Endeavour Foundation (EEF) in 2016/2017 with the endorsement of the United States Department of Energy to steward the Solar Decathlon in Europe. The EEF subsequently issued a Call for Cities for the 2019 edition, which was awarded  to Szentendre, Hungary in March 2017.

From this point onward the Energy Endeavour Foundation has fulfilled its stewarding role to the SDE editions organisers. Drawing upon the input of the SDE Council of Experts, the EEF provides continuity from one SDE edition to the next.

Solar Decathlon Europe 2019 
Solar Decathlon Europe 2019 took place in Szentendre, Hungary, July 12–July 28, 2019.

Official results:

Solar Decathlon Europe 2021/2022 
In July 2018 the Energy Endeavour Foundation (EEF) issued the Call for Cities for the 2021 edition of the Solar Decathlon Europe (SDE21). In early 2019, the EEF designated the city of Wuppertal, as the host city for the SDE21, led by a team from the University of Wuppertal and the Wuppertal Institute for Climate, Environment and Energy. Due to the COVID19 health crisis the Solar Decathlon Europe 2021 was postponed, and took between June 10 and June 26, 2022. The SDE21>22 took place on the Utopiastadt Campus. Utopiastadt participated in the "Solar Decathlon goes urban" concept of the 2021 competition.

The SDE21 Call for Teams was open until October 25, 2019, leading to the selection of 18 Teams from 11 countries. This edition of the SDE focuses on the requalification of urban environments, challenging the participating Teams in resolving one of three possible urban solutions: renovation and extension, closing gaps, and addition of stories.

The Teams that competed in the SDE21>22 were:

 , Grenoble, Grenoble School of Architecture, Team AuRA.
, Valencia, Polytechnic University of Valencia, Azalea.
, Gothenburg, Chalmers University of Technology, C-hive.
, Stuttgart, Stuttgart University of Applied Sciences, Collab.
 / , Istanbul / Lübeck, Istanbul Technical University / Lübeck Technical University of Applied Sciences, Deeply High.
, Bucharest, Ion Mincu University of Architecture and Urban Planning, EFdeN.
, Prague, Czech Technical University in Prague, FIRSTlife.
, Taipei, National Chiao Tung University, House for all.
, Rosenheim, Rosenheim Technical University of Applied Sciences, Level Up.
, Aachen, FH Aachen, Local+.
, Pécs, University of Pécs, Lungs of the City.
, Düsseldorf, Hochschule Düsseldorf, Mi-Mo.
, Karlsruhe, Karlsruhe Institute of Technology, RoofKit.
, Delft, Delft University of Technology, SUM.
, Eindhoven, Eindhoven University of Technology, Virtu/e.
, Biberach, Biberach University of Applied Science, X4s.

Two Teams from Bangkok, Thailand, SAB  from Bangkok University and Ur-Baan from King Mongkut's University of Technology Thonburi were unable to participate onsite due to high transportation costs.

Final ranking

1. Platz: Team RoofKIT, Karlsruhe Institute of Technology

2. Platz: Team VIRTUe, Eindhoven University of Technology

3. Platz (draw): Team SUM, Delft University of Technology und Team AuRA, Grenoble National School of Architecture

Solar Decathlon Europe 2023 

The Call for Cities for the Solar Decathlon Europe 2023 (available here: https://solardecathlon.eu/sde23_call-for-cities/) was launched on July 14, 2020 by the Energy Endeavour Foundation. On April 7, 2021, the Capital City of Romania, Bucharest was designed as Host City for the SDE23.

In January 2022, through a joint decision between The Energy Endeavour Foundation (governing body of the Solar Decathlon Europe) and the Solar Decathlon Bucharesti Association, EFdeN, (SDE23 Host City Executives) the SDE23 edition was closed.

The Closure was a result of continued repercussions caused by the COVID pandemic, which created high uncertainty and volatility, with ensuing economic, social, and public health challenges.

See also

 Solar Decathlon
 Solar Decathlon Africa
 Solar Decathlon China
 Solar Decathlon Middle East
 Solar Decathlon Latin America and Caribbean

References

External links

U.S. Department of Energy Solar Decathlon
Solar Decathlon Europe 2010 & 2012
Solar Decathlon Europe 2014
Very Cool Solar Homes - slideshow by Life magazine
Solar Decathlon 2010: Competing For The Greenest House - slideshow by The Huffington Post

Sustainable building
Building engineering
Sustainable architecture
Low-energy building
Energy conservation
Sustainable building in Europe
Solar Decathlon